The IIHF Super Cup was an ice hockey event played between each winner of the two main European club tournaments of the previous season.

In 1997 it was played between the champion of the European Hockey League and the champion of the IIHF European Cup. The next three years it was played between the champion of the European Hockey League and the champion of the IIHF Continental Cup.

IIHF Super Cup Finals

References
 Supercup 1997
 Supercup 1998
 Supercup 1999
 Supercup 2000

See also

European Hockey League
IIHF Continental Cup

International Ice Hockey Federation tournaments
Ice hockey tournaments in Europe
Recurring sporting events established in 1997
1997 establishments in Europe